A taboret (also spelled tabouret or tabourette) refers to two different pieces of furniture: a cabinet or a stool.

17th-century stool
As a stool, it refers to a short stool without a back or arms.  The name is derived from its resemblance to a drum (diminutive of Old French tabour).

The tabouret acquired a more specialized meaning in 17th-century France at the court of Louis XIV in Versailles. Sitting in the presence of the royal family was a much coveted honor, and the tabouret was the way to do it.  The court tabouret was an elaborate, upholstered stool with curved wooden legs and tassels, carried by a liveried and wigged servant. Duchesses were automatically granted the honor of sitting in front of the queen.  In fact, this stool became such a symbol of privilege that when Louis XIV's mother, the Regent Anne of Austria, granted the tabouret to two non-duchesses, such a storm of protest was raised that she had to revoke the order.

Arts and Crafts plant stand 
In the context of the Arts and Crafts Movement, a taboret is a narrow and tall stand for a plant, lamp, ashtray, or a beverage. Also a mission oak book stand shelf, or side table, or end table.

Modern cabinet 
The current sense refers to graphic artists' task furniture, a wheeled, portable stand or cabinet, with drawers and shelves for storage, used to bring supplies to a work area.

See also
 Stool (seat)

References

Furniture
Cabinets (furniture)
Chairs

bg:Табуретка
fr:Tabouret